Parabuthus brevimanus is a species of scorpion from southern Africa, that ranges from southern Angola to Namibia and western South Africa, where its range extends south of the Orange River.

Habits
It is a semipsammophilous species that inhabits compacted or semicompacted sandy or gravelly substrates, wherein it burrows either in open ground, or at the base of shrubs or grass tufts. The rows of long, comb-like bristles on the lower tarsi (third distal segment) of the four front legs are suggestive of its habits and habitat choice.

It prefers substantially more solid substrates than the sand dunes occupied by its close relatives P. kuanyamarum and P. nanus. It is syntopic with P. granulatus throughout its range, but less often so with P. laevifrons, P. schlechteri, and P. villosus than its near relative P. gracilis.

Relationships and characters
The species is basal to the clade that incorporates the P. distridor–P. kuanyamarum and P. gracilis–P. nanus sister groups. This clade is uniquely separable from other Parabuthus species by a combination of characters. They have a small adult size, with a carapace length of 0.25–0.5 cm. Their tail segments are slender, some about twice as long as their width, while the hindmost (4th and 5th) segments are almost devoid of ridges (carinae). Micro details of the pedipalps are also unique to the clade.

Identification
It is most similar to P. gracilis with which it is sympatric in the Erongo and Kunene regions of Namibia. It is, however, separable from all species in the clade by a range of characteristics. The surface of the middle (median) ocular tubercle is smooth and shiny in both sexes, besides the surrounding carapace surface of females. The pedipalp base (chela manus) is likewise smooth. Though some ridges (carinae) of the proximal four tail segments are weakly developed, the remaining ridges on the second and third segments comprise uniquely arranged processes and tubercles.

Notes

References

brevimanus
Scorpions of Africa
Animals described in 1862